Anicet Rasoanaivo (born 1969-12-27) is a retired male boxer from Madagascar, who twice competed for his African country at the Summer Olympics: 1992 and 1996. He is best known for twice winning a gold medal in the men's light flyweight division at the African Amateur Championships: 2001 and 2003.

References
 sports-reference

1969 births
Living people
Malagasy male boxers
Light-flyweight boxers
Boxers at the 1992 Summer Olympics
Boxers at the 1996 Summer Olympics
Olympic boxers of Madagascar
African Games silver medalists for Madagascar
African Games medalists in boxing
African Games bronze medalists for Madagascar
Competitors at the 1991 All-Africa Games
Competitors at the 1995 All-Africa Games